Moon Hee (born July 16, 1947) is a South Korean actress active since 1965. She was born in Pusan, South Korea in 1947. While attending Seorabeol Art College with a film and theater major, Moon applied for recruiting new actors by KBS TV. When she was attending for a camera test, Moon was picked up by an assistant director of Lee Man-hee . Moon was cast to star in Lee's film Heukmaek. Moon was commonly referred to as one of the "Troika" along with her rival actresses, Yoon Jeong-hee and Nam Jeong-im of the 1960s and early 1970s. Moon Hee retired from the acting career when she married Jang Gang-jae, the vice president of Hankook Ilbo in November 1971 who later became the chair of the newspaper company.

Filmography
*Note; the whole list is referenced.

Awards
 1966, the 5th Grand Bell Awards : New Actress (흑맥)
 1967, the 3rd Baeksang Arts Awards : New Film Actress
 1968, the 7th Grand Bell Awards : Best Actress (카인의 후예)
 1968, the 4th Baeksang Arts Awards : Best Film Acting (막차로 온 손님들)
 1969, the 6th Blue Dragon Film Awards : Favorite Actress
 1970, the 6th Baeksang Arts Awards : Favorite Film Actress selected by readers
 1970, the 7th Blue Dragon Film Awards : Favorite Actress
 1971, the 7th Baeksang Arts Awards : Favorite Film Actress selected by readers
 1971, the 8th Blue Dragon Film Awards : Favorite Actress

References

External links

1947 births
Living people
Actresses from Busan
20th-century South Korean actresses
South Korean film actresses
South Korean television actresses
Best Actress Paeksang Arts Award (film) winners
Best New Actress Paeksang Arts Award (film) winners